The 2014 Coral UK Open was a darts tournament staged by the Professional Darts Corporation. It was the twelfth year of the tournament where, following numerous regional qualifying heats throughout Britain, players competed in a single elimination tournament to be crowned champion. The tournament was held at the Butlin's Resort in Minehead, England, between 7–9 March 2014, and had the nickname, "the FA Cup of darts" as a random draw was staged after each round until the final.

Phil Taylor was the defending champion, but he suffered a huge upset by losing 9–7 to Aden Kirk in the third round.

Adrian Lewis won the fourth major title of his career beating Terry Jenkins 11–1 in the final.

Format and qualifiers

UK Open qualifiers
There were six qualifying events staged in February 2014 to determine the UK Open Order of Merit Table. The tournament winners were:

The tournament featured 138 players. The results of the six qualifiers shown above were collated into the UK Open Order Of Merit. The top 32 players in the Order of Merit received a place at the final tournament. In addition, the next 82 players plus ties in the Order of Merit list qualified for the tournament, but needed to start in the earlier rounds played on the Friday. A further 32 players qualified via regional qualifying tournaments.

Top 32 in Order of Merit (receiving byes into third round)

Number 33–64 of the Order of Merit (receiving byes into second round)

Remaining Order of Merit qualifiers (starting in first and preliminary round)

Riley qualifiers (starting in first and preliminary round)

32 amateur players qualified from Riley qualifiers held across the UK.

Prize money
The prize fund had increased from £200,000 to £250,000 for this year's event.

Draw

Friday 7 March; Best of nine legs

Preliminary round

First round

Second round

Third round; Best of seventeen legs

Saturday 8 March

Fourth round; Best of seventeen legs

Fifth round

Sunday 9 March

Quarter-finals; Best of nineteen legs

Semi-finals and Final

References

UK Open
UK Open
UK Open
UK Open